Simeon Makedonski (born April 4, 1977 in Varna, Bulgaria) is a retired butterfly swimmer from Bulgaria, who competed for his native country at the 2000 Summer Olympics in Sydney, Australia. In the qualifying round of the men's 100m butterfly, he swam the 100m in 55.49 seconds, but did not qualify for the semifinal.

Makedonski currently lives in the United States, with his wife, Hristina, and 2 children.

References

See also
 Swimming at the 2000 Summer Olympics

Bulgarian male swimmers
1977 births
Living people
Swimmers at the 2000 Summer Olympics
Olympic swimmers of Bulgaria
Sportspeople from Varna, Bulgaria